Masjed-e Mahalleh (also Romanized as Masjed-e Maḩalleh and Masjed Maḩallehsī) is a village in Gerdeh Rural District, in the Central District of Namin County, Ardabil Province, Iran. At the 2006 census, its population was 43, in 15 families.

References 

Towns and villages in Namin County